Frank X. Kugler (March 29, 1879, Germany – July 7, 1952, St. Louis, Missouri) was a German-American wrestler, weightlifter and tug of war competitor who competed in the 1904 Summer Olympics.

Biography
In 1904, he won a silver medal in wrestling's heavyweight category, bronze medals in weightlifting's two hand lift and all-around dumbbell events and another bronze in the tug of war competition as a member of Southwest Turnverein of Saint Louis No. 2 team. He was a member of the St. Louis Southwest Turnverein team, having immigrated from Germany to America and being granted US citizenship in 1913. The IOC had listed him as a member of the US delegation prior to 2022, and then assigned the medals he had won in St. Louis in 1904 to the German delegation.

Despite taking last place in 9 out of 10 events in the dumbbell competition he was awarded the bronze as there were only 3 competitors. He is the only competitor to win a medal in three different sports at the same Olympic Games.

See also
 Dual sport and multi-sport Olympians

References

1879 births
1952 deaths
American wrestlers
American male weightlifters
Wrestlers at the 1904 Summer Olympics
American male sport wrestlers
Weightlifters at the 1904 Summer Olympics
Tug of war competitors at the 1904 Summer Olympics
Olympic weightlifters of the United States
Olympic tug of war competitors of the United States
Olympic silver medalists for the United States in wrestling
Olympic bronze medalists for the United States in wrestling
Olympic medalists in weightlifting
Olympic medalists in tug of war
German emigrants to the United States
Medalists at the 1904 Summer Olympics